Ecstatic Orange is a ballet made by New York City Ballet ballet master (subsequently ballet master in chief) Peter Martins to Michael Torke's Verdant Music (1985), Purple (1987) and Ecstatic Orange (1985) for City Ballet's American Music Festival; the second movement, Purple, was to a score commissioned for the occasion. The premiere of the expanded version took place on 11 June 1987 at the New York State Theater, Lincoln Center, with lighting by Mark Stanley (an earlier version appeared in January of that year.) Ecstatic Orange was the first in a series of collaborations between the choreographer and composer.

Original cast
Heather Watts
Helene Alexopoulos
Victoria Hall
Jock Soto
Peter Frame
Mel Tomlinson

See also 
Ash
Black and White
Echo

References
Playbill, New York City Ballet, Friday, June 27, 2008

Articles 
Sunday NY Times by Anna Kisselgoff, July 7, 1991

Reviews 
  
NY Times by Anna Kisselgoff, January 17, 1987
NY Times by Anna Kisselgoff, June 13, 1987 
 
NY Times by Jack Anderson, May 12, 1988
NY Times by Alastair Macaulay, June 30, 2008

Ballets by Peter Martins
Ballets by Michael Torke
1987 ballet premieres
New York City Ballet repertory
New York City Ballet American Music Festival